Porno Graffitti is a Japanese rock band formed in 1994. As of September 2017, they have released forty-five singles, ten studio albums and five compilation albums. Also there are included numerous DVDs.

Studio albums

Compilation albums

Singles

Digital singles

References

Discographies of Japanese artists